Randi Gaustad (born 29 January 1942) is a Norwegian curator and art historian.

She was born in Oslo and took the mag.art. degree in 1973. She was a research assistant at the University of Oslo from 1974 to 1978, subeditor for the encyclopedia Norsk kunstnerleksikon from 1978 to 1983 and curator at the Norwegian Museum of Decorative Arts and Design since 1983. Important books include Gammelt norsk stentøy fra Egersund (1980) and Samtidskeramikk: Norsk keramikk fra 1940 til i dag (1990 with Gunnar Danbolt).

References

1942 births
Living people
Writers from Oslo
Norwegian art historians
Norwegian encyclopedists
Norwegian curators
Women encyclopedists
Norwegian women non-fiction writers
Norwegian women writers
Women art historians
Norwegian women historians
Norwegian women curators